Saint-Médard-de-Presque (Languedocien: Sant Miard de Presca) is a commune in the Lot department in south-western France.

See also
Communes of the Lot department
Grottes de Presque

References

Saintmedarddepresque